Ride 'Til I Die is the twelfth studio album by George Thorogood and the Destroyers. It was released in 2003.

Track listing
 "Greedy Man" (Eddie Shaw) – 3:21
 "American Made" (Charlie Midnight, Steve Hunter) – 4:06
 "Sweet Little Lady" (Thorogood, Suhler) – 3:50
 "Don't Let the Bossman Get You Down" (Elvin Bishop) – 2:50
 "Devil in Disguise" (J. J. Cale) – 3:10
 "She's Gone" (Theodore Roosevelt "Hound Dog" Taylor) – 3:44
 "The Fixer" (Richard Fleming, Tom Hambridge) – 3:19
 "You Don't Love Me, You Don't Care" (Ellas McDaniel) – 3:50
 "My Way" (Eddie Cochran, Jerry Capehart) – 2:53
 "That's It, I Quit" (Nick Lowe) – 2:37
 "I Washed My Hands In Muddy Water" (Joe Babcock) – 4:20
 "Move It" (Chuck Berry) – 4:47
 "Ride 'Til I Die" (John Lee Hooker, Jules Taub) – 4:07

Personnel

Musicians
George Thorogood – guitar, vocals
Jim Suhler – guitar
Bill Blough – bass
Jeff Simon – drums
Hank Carter – saxophone, vocals

Technical
Delaware Destroyers – producer
Jim Gaines – producer
Mike Donahue – executive producer
Jeremy Blair – engineer
Shawn Berman – engineer
Leon Zervos – mastering
John Hampton – mixing

References

George Thorogood and the Destroyers albums
2003 albums
Eagle Records albums